Arthur David Davis (December 6, 1934 – July 29, 2007) was a double-bassist, known for his work with Thelonious Monk, John Coltrane, Dizzy Gillespie, McCoy Tyner and Max Roach.

Biography
Davis was born in Harrisburg, Pennsylvania, United States, where he began studying the piano at the age of five, switched to tuba, and finally to bass while attending high school. He studied at Juilliard and Manhattan School of Music but graduated from Hunter College.

As a New York session musician, he recorded with many jazz and pop musicians and also in symphony orchestras such as the New York Philharmonic and Los Angeles Philharmonic. He recorded with Dizzy Gillespie, Max Roach, and John Coltrane among other jazz musicians. Art Davis was a professor at Orange Coast College.

Davis is also known for starting a legal case that led to blind auditions for orchestras.

Davis earned a Ph.D. in clinical psychology from New York University in 1982. He moved in 1986 to southern California, where he balanced his teaching and practicing of psychology with jazz performances.

Davis died on July 29, 2007, following a heart attack. He was survived by two sons and a daughter.

Discography

As leader
 Reemergence (Interplay, 1980) - with Hilton Ruiz, Greg Bandy
 Life (Soul Note, 1985) - with John Hicks, Idris Muhammad, Pharoah Sanders
 A Time Remembered (Jazz Planet, 1995) - with Ravi Coltrane, Herbie Hancock, Marvin Smith

As sideman
With Joe Albany
 Bird Lives! (Interplay, 1979)
With Gene Ammons
 Up Tight! (Prestige, 1961)
 Boss Soul! (Prestige, 1961)
With Count Basie
 Back with Basie (Roulette, 1962)
With Art Blakey
 A Jazz Message (Impulse!, 1963)
With John Coltrane
 Africa/Brass (Impulse!, 1961)
 Olé Coltrane (Impulse!, 1961)
 Ascension (Impulse!, 1965)
 The John Coltrane Quartet Plays (Impulse!, 1965)
With Buddy Emmons
 Steel Guitar Jazz (Mercury, 1964)
With Curtis Fuller
 Cabin in the Sky (Impulse!, 1962)
With Dizzy Gillespie
 Gillespiana (Verve, 1960)
 Carnegie Hall Concert (Verve, 1961)
With Bunky Green
Healing the Pain (Delos, 1990)
With Al Grey
The Al Grey - Billy Mitchell Sextet (Argo, 1961) with Billy Mitchell
With Eddie Harris
 Bossa Nova (Vee-Jay, 1962)
With Freddie Hubbard
 The Artistry of Freddie Hubbard (Impulse!, 1960)
 Ready for Freddie (Blue Note, 1961)
With Hasaan Ibn Ali
Metaphysics: The Lost Atlantic Album (Omnivore, 1965; released 2021)
With Elvin Jones
 Elvin! (Riverside, 1961–62)
 And Then Again (Atlantic, 1965)
With Etta Jones
 Lonely and Blue (Prestige, 1962)
With Quincy Jones
 Golden Boy (Mercury, 1964)
With Clifford Jordan
 A Story Tale (Jazzland, 1961)  with Sonny Red
With Roland Kirk
 We Free Kings (1961)
With Abbey Lincoln
 Straight Ahead (Candid, 1961)
With Booker Little
 Out Front (Candid, 1961)
With Roberto Magris
 Kansas City Outbound (JMood, 2008)
With Lee Morgan
 Expoobident (1960)
With Tisziji Munoz
 Visiting This Planet (Anami Music, 1980's)
 Hearing Voices (Anami Music, 1980's)
With Joe Newman
 Joe Newman Quintet at Count Basie's (Mercury, 1961)
With Dizzy Reece
 Manhattan Project (1978)
With Max Roach
 Max Roach + 4 at Newport (EmArcy, 1958)
 Deeds, Not Words (Riverside, 1958)
 Award-Winning Drummer (Time, 1958)
 The Many Sides of Max (Mercury, 1959)
 Percussion Bitter Sweet (Impulse!, 1961)
 It's Time (Impulse!, 1962)
 The Max Roach Trio featuring the Legendary Hasaan (Atlantic, 1964)
With Hilton Ruiz
 The People's Music – Live at Jazz Unité, vol 1 (1981)
 Green Street – Live at Jazz Unité, vol 2 (1981)
With Sal Salvador
 Juicy Lucy (Bee Hive, 1978)
With Pharoah Sanders
 Rejoice (Theresa, 1981)
With Lalo Schifrin
 Lalo = Brilliance (Roulette, 1962)
With Shirley Scott
 For Members Only (Impulse!, 1963)
With Jack Teagarden
Think Well of Me (Verve, 1962)
With Clark Terry
 Clark Terry Plays the Jazz Version of All American (Moodsville, 1962)
With McCoy Tyner
 Inception (1962)
With Leo Wright
 Blues Shout (Atlantic, 1960)

References

External links
 Art Davis Discography at Jazz Discography

1934 births
2007 deaths
American jazz double-bassists
Male double-bassists
American jazz composers
American male jazz composers
Hard bop double-bassists
Musicians from Harrisburg, Pennsylvania
Post-bop double-bassists
Jazz musicians from Pennsylvania
20th-century double-bassists
20th-century American male musicians
20th-century jazz composers
20th-century African-American musicians
21st-century African-American people